Live at the Whitney is a live album by the American pianist, composer and bandleader Duke Ellington, recorded at the  Whitney Museum of American Art in 1972 and released on the Impulse! label in 1995.

Reception
The AllMusic review by Scott Yanow stated: "Although Duke apparently planned very little in advance, his program is a well-rounded set of old standards and newer (and more obscure) works. A week short of his 73rd birthday, Ellington's fingers sound a little rusty in spots, but he clearly gets stronger as the concert progresses".

Track listing
All compositions by Duke Ellington except as indicated
 Opening Remarks - 1:06  
 "Medley: Black and Tan Fantasy/Prelude to a Kiss/Do Nothing till You Hear from Me/Caravan" (Ellington, James "Bubber" Miley/ Ellington Irving Mills/Ellington, Bob Russell/Juan Tizol) - 6:51
 "Meditation" - 2:39  
 "A Mural from Two Perspectives" - 2:56  
 "Sophisticated Lady/Solitude" (Ellington, Mills/Ellington, Mills, Eddie DeLange) - 4:44  
 "Soda Fountain Rag" - 1:18  
 "New World A-Comin'" - 9:02  
 "Amour, Amour" - 1:41  
 "Soul Soothing Beach" - 2:51  
 "Lotus Blossom" (Billy Strayhorn) - 2:35  
 "Flamingo" (Edmund Anderson, Ted Grouya) - 1:35  
 "Le Sucrier Velours" - 1:44  
 "The Night Shepherd" - 2:45  
 "C Jam Blues" (Barney Bigard, Ellington) - 3:04  
 "Mood Indigo" (Bigard, Ellington, Mills) - 2:06  
 "I'm Beginning to See the Light" (Ellington, Don George, Johnny Hodges, Harry James) - 1:23  
 "Dancers in Love" - 2:13  
 "Kixx" - 1:35  
 "Satin Doll" (Ellington, Strayhorn) - 3:07  
Recorded at the Whitney Museum of American Art in New York on April 10, 1972.

Personnel
Duke Ellington – piano
Joe Benjamin - bass
Rufus Jones - drums

References

Duke Ellington live albums
1995 live albums
Impulse! Records live albums
1972 live albums